Ina Brouwer (born 11 April 1950) is a Dutch retired politician of the Communist Party of the Netherlands (CPN) and later co-founder of the GroenLinks (GL) party and lawyer.

Education and early career
Brouwer studied Law at Groningen University. There, Brouwer came in touch with social security law and socially engaged lawyers. Inspired by this side of the legal profession, Brouwer became a member of the Communist Party of the Netherlands. In 1981, she became a member of the House of Representatives for the CPN. In 1981, she succeeded Marcus Bakker as chairperson of the CPN parliamentary party. She remained in the House of Representatives until 1986, when the CPN lost its three seats in the election and disappeared from the House.

Brouwer was a longtime advocate of a merger of the CPN, the Christian left Political Party of Radicals and Evangelical People's Party and the leftwing socialist Pacifist Socialist Party to form a new left-wing formation. In 1989 this was realized, and the new party was called GroenLinks. After the 1989 elections Brouwer returned to the House of Representatives, as a member of parliament for GroenLinks. Between 1990 and 1991, Brouwer was one of the first members of parliament to leave the House of Representatives for a short period to give birth. The duo Ina Brouwer/Mohammed Rabbae were the top candidate for the 1994 elections after winning a preliminary from Paul Rosenmöller/Leonie Sipkes. Brouwer and Rabbae were not very successful in the general elections and the party lost one of its six seats. Brouwer announced that she would step down and not take her seat in parliament.

Between 1995 and 2003, Brouwer worked at the Ministry of Social Affairs and Employment as director for emancipation and a quartermaster for the Academy of the ministry. In 2003, she published a book, Het glazen plafond. Vrouwen aan de top, verlangens & obstakels ("The Glass ceiling. Women at the top, desires, and obstacles") on the position of women on the labour market. In 2005 Brouwer became a senior advisor at Twynstra Gudde, where she advises public institutions on diversity, social affairs and government reform.

In January 2007, Ina Brouwer announced that she became a member of the Dutch Labour Party in addition to her membership of GroenLinks. She did this in protest against GroenLinks' decision to abandon negotiations with the Labour Party, the Christian Democratic Appeal, and the Christian Union during the cabinet formation. Brouwer thought that this was a missed opportunity.

References

External links

Official
  Mr. I. (Ina) Brouwer Parlement & Politiek

|-

|-

|-

1950 births
Living people
Chairmen of GroenLinks
Chairmen of the Communist Party of the Netherlands
Leaders of the Communist Party of the Netherlands
Leaders of GroenLinks
Dutch atheists
Dutch health and wellness writers
Dutch nonprofit directors
Dutch nonprofit executives
Dutch relationships and sexuality writers
Dutch trade association executives
Dutch political consultants
Dutch women activists
Dutch activists
Dutch women lawyers
Dutch political party founders
GroenLinks politicians
Members of the House of Representatives (Netherlands)
Politicians from Amsterdam
Lawyers from Rotterdam
Dutch socialist feminists
University of Groningen alumni
20th-century Dutch civil servants
20th-century Dutch educators
20th-century Dutch lawyers
20th-century Dutch women politicians
20th-century Dutch politicians
20th-century Dutch women writers
21st-century Dutch civil servants
21st-century Dutch educators
21st-century Dutch lawyers
21st-century Dutch women writers
20th-century women lawyers
21st-century women lawyers